Sulfur fluoride may refer to any of the following sulfur fluorides:

Sulfur hexafluoride, SF6
Disulfur decafluoride, S2F10
Sulfur tetrafluoride, SF4
Disulfur tetrafluoride, S2F4
Sulfur difluoride, SF2
Disulfur difluoride, S2F2
Thiothionyl fluoride, S2F2 (second isomer)

See also
Chlorine oxides, some of which are valence isoelectronic with sulfur fluorides